The Parkersburg–Vienna metropolitan area, officially the Parkersburg–Vienna, WV Metropolitan Statistical Area as defined by the United States Census Bureau, is an area consisting of two counties in West Virginia, anchored by the cities of Parkersburg and Vienna. As of the 2020 census, the MSA had a population of 89,490. Prior to the 2020 census, the metro area included the city of Marietta, Ohio and Washington County, which has since been redefined as its own micropolitan area. They now form the Parkersburg–Marietta–Vienna, WV-OH Combined Statistical Area.

Counties
 Washington County, Ohio
 Wirt County, West Virginia
 Wood County, West Virginia

Communities

Places with 10,000 to 30,000 inhabitants
 Marietta, Ohio (Principal city)
 Parkersburg, West Virginia (Principal city)
 Vienna, West Virginia (Principal city)

Places with 1,000 to 10,000 inhabitants
 Belmont, West Virginia
 Belpre, Ohio
 Beverly, Ohio
 Blennerhassett, West Virginia (census-designated place)
 Boaz, West Virginia (census-designated place)
 Devola, Ohio (census-designated place)
 Lubeck, West Virginia (census-designated place)
 Mineral Wells, West Virginia (census-designated place)
 St. Marys, West Virginia
 Washington, West Virginia (census-designated place)
 Williamstown, West Virginia

Places with less than 1,000 inhabitants
 Elizabeth, West Virginia
 Lowell, Ohio
 Lower Salem, Ohio
 Macksburg, Ohio
 Matamoras, Ohio
 North Hills, West Virginia

Unincorporated places

 Barlow, Ohio
 Bartlett, Ohio
 Burning Springs, West Virginia
 Calcutta, West Virginia
 Coal Run, Ohio
 Cutler, Ohio
 Fleming, Ohio

 Germantown, Ohio
 Hebron, West Virginia
 Little Hocking, Ohio
 Newport, Ohio
 Palestine, West Virginia
 Pine Grove, West Virginia

 Reno, Ohio
 Vincent, Ohio
 Waterford, Ohio
 Watertown, Ohio
 Whipple, Ohio
 Wingett Run, Ohio

Townships (Washington County, Ohio)

 Adams
 Aurelius
 Barlow
 Belpre
 Decatur
 Dunham
 Fairfield
 Fearing

 Grandview
 Independence
 Lawrence
 Liberty
 Ludlow
 Marietta
 Muskingum

 Newport
 Palmer
 Salem
 Warren
 Waterford
 Watertown
 Wesley

Demographics

As of the census of 2000, there were 164,624 people, 66,583 households, and 46,390 families residing within the MSA. The racial makeup of the MSA was 97.41% White, 0.93% African American, 0.23% Native American, 0.45% Asian, 0.04% Pacific Islander, 0.13% from other races, and 0.80% from two or more races. Hispanic or Latino of any race were 0.54% of the population.

The median income for a household in the MSA was $32,761, and the median income for a family was $38,427. Males had a median income of $31,772 versus $26,499 for females. The per capita income for the MSA was $16,769.

See also
 West Virginia census statistical areas
 Ohio census statistical areas

References

 
Metropolitan areas of West Virginia
Metropolitan areas of Ohio